The Grand Lodge of Michigan of Free and Accepted Masons, commonly known as Grand Lodge of Michigan, in tandem with the Most Worshipful Prince Hall Grand Lodge of Michigan govern the practice of regular Freemasonry in the state of Michigan.

History
It is uncertain when Freemasonry came to the Great Lakes area, though it is known that it was first brought to the area by the French at a time when it was Indian Territory. The earliest documented Lodge west of the Allegheny Mountains was warranted in Detroit on April 27, 1764, by George Harison, Provincial Grand Master of the Provincial Grand Lodge of New York, with Lt. John Christie of the 2nd Battalion, 60th Royal American Foot Regiment as Worshipful Master. By 1772, there were at least three Lodges functioning at Detroit: Lodge No. 1 and two Irish Military Lodges, Nos. 299 and 378, warranted to Masons of the 10th Regiment, then stationed at Detroit. The next three Lodges warranted for work in Michigan were also started by members of the visiting military. These were Harmony Lodge in Detroit, St. Johns Lodge No. 15 on the island of Mackinac and Zion Lodge No. 10 (now No. 1) warranted in 1794 for work in Detroit.

In September 1817 Zion Lodge provided much needed support for the newly created University of Michigan. The idea first took shape in the minds of Augustus Woodward, a Mason and the first Judge of the Territorial Supreme Court; the Reverend John Monteith, a Presbyterian clergyman and Father Gabriel Richard, a Roman Catholic Priest. On September 15, Zion Lodge met and subscribed the sum of $250 in aid of the University of Michigan, payable in the sum of $50 per year. Of the total amount subscribed to start the University two-thirds came from Zion Lodge and its members.

The members of Zion Lodge sponsored and supported additional Lodges in Upper Canada and Michigan including Detroit Lodge No. 337 (now No. 2), Oakland Lodge No. 343 in Pontiac, Menomenie Lodge No. 374 in Green Bay (then a part of the Territory) and Monroe Lodge No. 375 in Monroe. These five Lodges laid plans for a Grand Lodge in the Territory to handle the growing plans for Masonry in the area, and in June 1826 a Grand Lodge for the Territory of Michigan was established in Detroit. There are 274 Lodges in the State of Michigan at the present time.

List of Grand Masters
List of past and current Grand Masters of the Grand Lodge of Michigan

See also
 Detroit Masonic Temple

References

External links
Michigan Masons (official site)
Michigan Child ID Program
Masonic Pathways Senior Living Services

Freemasonry in the United States
Organizations based in Michigan
1826 establishments in Michigan Territory